The following events occurred in October 1959:

October 1, 1959 (Thursday)
Aleksandr Alekseyev, a Soviet KGB agent and correspondent for TASS, arrived in Cuba to forge a relationship between the U.S.S.R. and the Castro government. By October 12, he had met with Che Guevara, and by October 15 with Fidel Castro, creating a Soviet ally  from the United States.
On this date, funds were approved by NASA Headquarters for the following major changes to the Mercury spacecraft: egress hatch installation (CCP-58-1), astronaut observation window installation (CCP-73); rate stabilization and control system (CCP-61-2), main instrument and panel redesign (CCP-76), installation of reefed ringsail landing parachute (CCP-41), and nonspecification configurations of spacecraft (CCP-8). With reference to the last item, the original contract with McDonnell had specified only one spacecraft configuration, but the various research and development flight tests required changes in the configuration.
NFL Enterprises, the forerunner to NFL Properties, was created as a joint project between Western star Roy Rogers and the owners of the 12 NFL teams. The first licensed product was glassware, to be given away at Standard Oil filling stations.
Born: Brian P. Cleary, American children's author, in Lakewood, Ohio; Youssou N'Dour, Senegalese singer, in Dakar

October 2, 1959 (Friday)
The political system of Panchayati Raj was revived in India, starting with legislation in the State of Rajasthan to allow villages to elect their own local council (Gram Panchayat) to have authority on selected issues. The first new councils were in villages in the Nagaur district.
A total eclipse of the sun was visible from the northeast United States to West Africa. During the brief time in which the Moon came between the Sun and the Earth, Maurice Allais confirmed the "Allais effect", causing a change in the swing of a pendulum, which he had first observed during a 1954 total eclipse. The point of greatest eclipse was in the Sahara Desert in Mali.
General Motors introduced the Chevrolet Corvair automobile. The Corvair, subject of Ralph Nader's 1965 book Unsafe at Any Speed, was manufactured until the 1969 model.
Specifications for the Mercury pressure suit were issued. The suit procurement program was divided into two phases: Phase I, operational research suits which could be used for astronaut training, system evaluation, and further suit development; and Phase II, Mercury pressure suits in the final configuration.
The Twilight Zone debuted on CBS television with the episode "Where Is Everybody?"

October 3, 1959 (Saturday)

The ballistic missile submarine, USS Theodore Roosevelt, was launched from Mare Island. Alice Roosevelt Longworth, the 75-year-old daughter of the 26th American president, broke the champagne across the submarine hull on her second attempt.
Born: 
Fred Couples, American professional golfer (1992 Masters), in Seattle
Greg Proops, American comedian, in Phoenix
Jack Wagner, American actor (General Hospital) in Washington, Missouri

October 4, 1959 (Sunday)
Lunik 3, billed by the Soviet Union as "the first automatic space station", was launched into space. It would orbit the Moon and show a side never before seen by humanity.
A Little Joe launch vehicle carrying a boilerplate Mercury spacecraft (LJ-6) was successfully launched from Wallops Island. Objectives of the flight were to check the integrity of the launch vehicle airframe and motor system, check the operations of the launcher, to check the validity of the calculated wind corrections, to obtain performance and drag data, and to check the operation of the destruct system. The flight, lasting 5 minutes 10 seconds, gained a peak altitude of 37.12 statute miles, and a range of 79.4 statute miles. The destruct packages carried on board the Little Joe launch vehicles were successfully initiated well after the flight had reached its apex. There was a slight malfunction in the Little Joe launch vehicle when ignition of the two second-stage Pollux motors fired before the exact time planned. Actually, the planned trajectory was little affected and the structural test of the vehicle, really greater than planned, was benefited.
Born: Chris Lowe, British musician (Pet Shop Boys), in Blackpool, Lancashire

October 5, 1959 (Monday)
The IBM 1401 computer and data processing system was introduced, providing the first fully transistorized computer intended for business use. The three-piece system, which could be rented for $2,500 a month, had a memory ranging from 1.4 KB to 16K, could read 800 punchcards per minute and could print 600 lines per minute. More than 14,000 units were installed.
The Mead Johnson food company introduced two powdered nutrition products, both of which became popular, on the same day. Enfamil, which remains an active brand 60 years later, was the first infant formula designed to be "a low protein duplication of mother's milk", while Metrecal was a low-calorie diet food, to be mixed with water for form a milk shake like product and "containing the essential nutrients of protein, carbohydrate, fat, vitamins and minerals" to be consumed four times a day for 900 calories of nutrition.
Born:
Maya Lin, American architect best known for Vietnam Memorial, in Athens, Ohio
Kelly Joe Phelps, blues musician, in Sumner, Washington

October 6, 1959 (Tuesday)
At a congressional subcommittee hearing investigating allegations of fraud on television quiz programs, former game show contestants Herbert Stempel and James Snodgrass revealed that they had been supplied the answers in advance on the show Twenty-One.  The two would be portrayed in the film Quiz Show by John Turturro and Douglas McGrath, respectively, in 1994.
Cambodia filed suit against Thailand in the World Court claiming a violation of its territory by Thai use of the Temple of Preah Vihear.  In 1962, the Court ruled in favor of Cambodia.
The International Olive Oil Council was created, with 17 member nations, representing 97% of the world's exports of olive oil.
A record 92,706 fans watched Game 5 of the World Series between the Dodgers and the White Sox.

October 7, 1959 (Wednesday)
From 0330 to 0410 GMT, the Lunik 3 probe took the first pictures of the far side of the Moon, 29 images that were later transmitted back to Earth.
It was the first time that a surface-to-air missile (SAM) had brought down an aircraft.
On Baghdad's al-Rashid Street, Iraq's President Abd al-Karim Qasim was ambushed on his way to the East German embassy. The five-man team, led by future Iraqi President Saddam Hussein, killed Qasim's driver and wounded Qasim. One assassin died and Saddam himself was injured, but escaped to a farm. After the U.S. invasion of Iraq in 2003, Saddam fled to the same farm, where he was captured on December 13 of that year.
The U.S. Court of Claims ruled that the Tlingit and Haida Indian tribes had been the original owners of southeast Alaska and entitled to monetary compensation.
Born: 
Simon Cowell, English television producer and judge (American Idol and Britain's Got Talent), in Brighton, East Sussex 
Lourdes Flores, Peruvian presidential candidate 2001 and 2006; in Lima 
Michael Paré, American film actor (The Philadelphia Experiment), in Brooklyn

Died: Mario Lanza, 38, American tenor, died of a pulmonary embolism

October 8, 1959 (Thursday)
In the British general election, the Conservatives (led by Prime Minister Harold Macmillan) increased their majority in Parliament, capturing 365 of the 630 seats.  Labour had 258 seats, followed by the Liberals (6) and the Independent Conservative Party (1).
The Los Angeles Dodgers beat the Chicago White Sox 9–3 to win the 1959 World Series in the sixth game.  Larry Sherry, the winning pitcher, had saved Games 2, 3 and 4 as well.
The Central Committee of the Communist Party of the Soviet Union issued "About some changes in History lessons in school", a decree revising the curriculum and textbooks in Soviet schools, with an emphasis on "the inevitability of the collapse of capitalism and the triumph of communism."

October 9, 1959 (Friday)
Russell Langelle, a CIA agent with a cover as security officer at the Embassy of the United States in Moscow, was arrested as he stepped off a city bus, where he had met Soviet double-agent Pyotr Popov. Langelle was expelled from the Soviet Union, and Popov was later executed for treason.

Eugene Bullard, who had been the first African-American military pilot, received the Croix de la Légion d'honneur, France's highest military award, at a ceremony in Paris, for his services to the French Foreign Legion during World War I.
Died: Shiro Ishii, 67, Japanese germ warfare specialist who was granted immunity from war crimes prosecution

October 10, 1959 (Saturday)
Fatah, Palestinian nationalist political party, was founded by Yasser Arafat, Khalil al-Wazir, and others to fight for Palestinian independence. "Fatah" is a reverse acronym for Harakat al Tahir al Filastini.
A courageous letter of protest from author Viktor Nekrasov appeared in the Soviet weekly Literaturnaya Gazeta, after Nekrasov learned that the city planners of Kiev planned to pave over Babi Yar, site of the 1941 Nazi massacre of more than 30,000 Ukrainians, mostly Jews.  Learning that a soccer stadium was to be built there, Nekrasov wrote, "How is this possible?  Who could have thought of such a thing?  On the site of such a colossal tragedy to make merry and play football?  No! This must not be allowed!"   Yevgeny Yevtushenko and Anatoly Kuznetsov were inspired by Nekrasov's protest to write their own works about Babi Yar.

The Watts Towers, a metal sculpture by Simon Rodia, withstood a "10,000 pound pull" stress test and earned its right to remain a Los Angeles landmark.  The city's Building and Safety Department had ordered the demolition of the landmark, but agreed to let Rodia prove that the  structure would not collapse.
James Earl Ray was arrested after robbing a supermarket in St. Louis, and given a 20-year sentence in the Missouri State Penitentiary.  With more than twelve years remaining on his jail term, Ray would escape on April 23, 1967, and would carry out the assassination of Martin Luther King Jr. the following year.
Born: Kirsty MacColl, British singer and songwriter, in Croydon (killed in boating accident, 2000)

October 11, 1959 (Sunday)
War broke out in the Belgian Congo between two rival tribes, the Lulua and the Baluba, in the city of Luluabourg (now Kananga).  Fighting would continue throughout the first campaigns for the first elected legislature in May, 1960, in advance of the Congo's independence from Belgium. 
Elections were held in the Malagasy Republic on the island of Madagascar for the leaders of 739 rural communes, scheduled to take office on January 1.  "The great majority of rural voters," a historian would later note, "had no idea what the new communes were for, and most of the officers elected not only were illiterate but lacked a sense of civic responsibility."   
Died: 
Bert Bell, 64, the Commissioner of the National Football League, died of a heart attack while attending the Eagles-Steelers game in Philadelphia.  Bell, who had been Commissioner since 1946, had owned both teams earlier in his career.  Sports columnist Red Smith later wrote, "It was like Caruso dying in the third act of Pagliacci".
Rex Griffin, 53, American country singer
Nop Bophann, the editor of Pracheachon, a leftist newsweekly in Cambodia, died of his wounds two days after he was shot by the kingdom's security police while leaving his office.  One author would comment later, "His death was probably intended as a gesture of reassurance to the Right that, notwithstanding Cambodia's difficulties with America, the communists would be held in check."

October 12, 1959 (Monday)
The first successful test of an anti-satellite weapon took place as a missile, fired from a B-47 bomber,  passed within four miles of the orbiting satellite Explorer 4, close enough to be destroyed by a one megaton nuclear explosion.
Yuri Gagarin and Georgi Shonin were among the first test pilots selected to be Soviet cosmonauts, following evaluations at the air base at Murmansk.  Gagarin would become, on April 12, 1961, the first man in outer space aboard Vostok 1.
Died: Arnolt Bronnen, 64, Austrian playwright and film director

October 13, 1959 (Tuesday)
The satellite Explorer 7 was launched, carrying a radiometer invented by Verner E. Suomi, and other devices that permitted the first measurements from space of Earth's radiation and the first climatological studies. This satellite also successfully demonstrated a method of controlling internal temperatures.
Born: Marie Osmond, American pop singer (Paper Roses), in Ogden, Utah

October 14, 1959 (Wednesday)

Ruth Urdanivia, a widow in Allentown, Pennsylvania, murdered her five children with overdoses of barbiturates, and unsuccessfully attempted suicide.  After being found sane to stand trial, she pleaded guilty and was sentenced to life in prison.  She was paroled in 1967.
Died: 
Errol Flynn, 50, Australian-born film actor who popularized the "swashbuckler" action film genre, died of a heart attack 
Alphonso Trent, 54, American jazz pianist

October 15, 1959 (Thursday)
Ukrainian nationalist Stepan Bandera was murdered by KGB agent Bogdan Stashinsky in Munich, West Germany. The weapon was a gun that fired hydrogen cyanide gas into Bandera's face. Stashinsky, who had killed newspaperman Lev Rebet in the same manner in 1957, swallowed an antidote and escaped.
The Antarctic Conference opened in Washington with representatives of 12 nations in attendance. The Antarctic Treaty was signed on December 1 and became effective in 1961.
Space Task Group personnel held a meeting at Langley Research Center with representatives from the Lewis Research Center to clarify Project Mercury research support needs at Lewis. During the course of discussion, several test and support areas were agreed upon. As an example, Lewis would conduct separation tests in which full-scale hardware was used to determine if a satisfactory separation existed. In these tests separation would occur when the posigrade rockets were fired after burnout of the Atlas during an ordinary mission. Lewis would seek to determine if there were any harmful effects due to flame impingement either on the Atlas booster or on the wiring of the retrograde package. In addition, Lewis would determine the actual effective impulse of the posigrade rockets during separation. Lewis also agreed to support Space Task Group in developing pilot techniques in a special tunnel at Lewis. The objectives were to determine a pilot's capability to stabilize spacecraft attitudes in space. Lewis had a large gimballed system in the tunnel that would simulate the motions of space conditions, but in a sea-level environment. It was thought, however, that experience in the gimballed system would be beneficial to the pilots. A third area of support involved retrorocket calibration tests. At that time, Space Task Group was concerned that when the retrorockets were fired, the spacecraft would be considerably upset while in orbital flight. Lewis would use its high-altitude tunnel at maximum capability to determine the extent of the upset and assist in devising means to control the situation. Lewis also agreed to check the hydrogen-peroxide-fueled control system to obtain starting and performance characteristics of the reaction jets. In the last area of this series of studies and tests, Lewis was to study the escape rocket plume when the rocket was fired at high altitudes to determine the effect of the plume on the spacecraft. It was believed that the plume would completely envelop the spacecraft.
A B-52F Stratofortress bomber, carrying two nuclear weapons, collided with a KC-135 refueling tanker, causing both planes to explode in mid-air and killing seven of the 12 people on the two airplanes, though four members of the bomber crew were able to parachute to safety. The collision happened over Breckinridge County, Kentucky in the U.S., with the bomber (and its nuclear weapons) crashing on a farm near the community of Glen Dean and the tanker hitting a hillside near McQuady. The two nuclear weapons on the bomber were recovered without release of radiation.

The television series The Untouchables, based on the autobiography of federal Prohibition enforcement agent Eliot Ness, premiered on ABC as one of the most violent shows ever to be shown on television, with killings of Chicago gangsters shown on every episode. Starring Robert Stack as Ness, the show would run for four seasons and 118 episodes and was popular in spite of (or perhaps because of) its violent nature.
Born:  
Sarah Ferguson, English publishing firm employee who was married to Britain's Prince Andrew from 1986 to 1996 and was popularly known as "Fergie". After the divorce, she was no longer a member of British royalty but retained nobility as the Duchess of York.
Emeril Lagasse, American chef and TV celebrity known generally as "Emeril"; in Fall River, Massachusetts
Died:  
Phetsarath Rattanavongsa, 69, former Prime Minister of Laos who served for six months as the head of state after King Sisavang Vong was temporarily removed from office 
Elliott White Springs, 63, American World War I ace credited with shooting down 16 enemy aircraft

October 16, 1959 (Friday)
Lee Harvey Oswald arrived in Moscow on a six-day visa, and applied for Soviet citizenship.  Coincidentally, he would begin work at the Texas School Book Depository four years to the day later, on October 16, 1963.
Television was inaugurated in the State of Western Australia as TVW7 went on the air.

Died: George C. Marshall, 78, World War II general, United States Secretary of State 1947–1949, and 1953 Nobel Peace Prize laureate in recognition of the Marshall Plan for aid to Western Europe during the Cold War

October 17, 1959 (Saturday)
Belgian authorities in colonial Rwanda removed three Tutsi chiefs, Kayihura, Rwangombwa, and Mungalurire, for inciting their tribesmen to violence against the Hutu tribe.
After 26 years and 9,477 performances at the Theatre Mart in Los Angeles, the William H. Smith temperance play The Drunkard closed.
Born: 
Francisco Flores Pérez, President of El Salvador 1999–2004, in Santa Ana (d. 2016) 
Norm MacDonald, Canadian actor and comedian, in Quebec City (d. 2021)
Richard Roeper, American film critic for the Chicago Sun-Times and successor to the late Gene Siskel as co-host (with Roger Ebert), of At the Movies; in Chicago
Ron Drummond, American music historian, in Seattle

October 18, 1959 (Sunday)
The X-3C, a circular wing hovercraft designed at Princeton University, made its first flight.  Twenty feet in diameter and constructed of aluminum, the X-3C has been described as the closest approximation to a flying saucer.
Former President Harry S. Truman appeared in a series of comic sketches on The Jack Benny Program.  Critics disagreed on whether the dignity of the American presidency had been compromised.
Died: Boughera El Ouafi, 61, Algerian runner and 1928 Olympic marathon winner, was shot to death while dining in a cafe

October 19, 1959 (Monday)
The Miracle Worker, starring Anne Bancroft as Annie Sullivan and Patty Duke as Helen Keller, opened on Broadway at the (now closed) Playhouse Theatre.  The production won a Tony Award for the best play, best dramatic actress (for Bancroft), and best director (Arthur Penn).

October 20, 1959 (Tuesday)
The University of Oxford revised its rules to elevate its five affiliated women's colleges (Lady Margaret Hall or LMH, Somerville, St Anne's, St Hugh's and St Hilda's) to equal status with its men's colleges.
Requests were initiated to test the Mercury spacecraft afterbody shingles at the Navy's Dangerfield test facility for heat resistance and dynamic-pressure capabilities.
Died: Werner Krauss, 75, German film actor

October 21, 1959 (Wednesday)

The Solomon R. Guggenheim Museum, popularly referred to as "the Guggenheim", opened in New York. The art museum, designed by Frank Lloyd Wright, is built in the form of a spiral.
After being told to leave the U.S.S.R., Lee Harvey Oswald slashed his wrists at his Moscow hotel room. His life was saved after Rima Shirokova found Oswald unconscious and had him taken to the Botkinskaya Hospital.
Major Pedro Díaz Lanz, who had been chief of the Cuban Air Force until defecting in July, flew an airplane from Florida and dropped thousands of leaflets over Havana, then returned to the U.S. In the chaos that followed, two people died and 45 were injured, and Fidel Castro charged that the United States had bombed Cuba.
Wernher von Braun's team of rocket scientists was transferred from the Army Ballistic Missile Agency to NASA.
Ten members of India's Central Reserve Police Force (CRPF) were killed at the Kongka Pass near Ladakh at Hot Springs, while defending against an incursion by soldiers from the neighboring People's Republic of China. The other members of the 21-man patrol were taken prisoner, though later released. October 21 is now observed as Police Commemoration Day throughout India.
Born: 
Ken Watanabe, Japanese film actor known for The Last Samurai; in Koide 
Tony Ganios, American film actor known for Porky's; in Brooklyn

October 22, 1959 (Thursday)
Rioting broke out in San'ya, the ghetto area of Tokyo, as a crowd of about 300 attacked the local police station.
The Franco-German Extradition Treaty, adopted in 1951, went into effect.
VES (vesicular exanthema of swine), which had caused a 15-month-long epizootic in 1952 and 1953, was declared to be eradicated.
Died: Joseph Cahill, 68, Premier of New South Wales since 1952, died of a heart attack.

October 23, 1959 (Friday)
India and Pakistan signed an agreement that provided that any border disputes would be submitted to "an impartial tribunal consisting of three members".
The Mummy, the most popular horror film to that time, was released in American theaters.
Born: "Weird Al" Yankovic, American singer and parodist; in Lynwood, California

October 24, 1959 (Saturday)
Cuba instituted Law 851, nationalizing more than 150 American investments, including the hotels, casinos and racetrack.  Foreign tourism, which had been nearly 275,000 in 1957, fell to 87,000 by 1960.
Playboy's Penthouse began a brief run on syndicated television.  Broadcast live from Chicago, the program was in the format of a cocktail party hosted by Hugh Hefner.  Besides increasing sales of the magazine, the program paved the way to the creation of the Playboy Clubs.

October 25, 1959 (Sunday)
A propeller driven plane served as Air Force One for the last time.  President Eisenhower flew from Augusta, Georgia, back to Washington on the "Columbine", a VC-121E Super Constellation.
The shrine "Our Lady of the Highways" was dedicated on Route 66 in Litchfield, Illinois, for travelers who wished to seek the assistance of the Virgin Mary on their journeys.
Born: Christina Amphlett, Australian singer for the Divinyls; in Geelong, Victoria (died 2013 from breast cancer)

October 26, 1959 (Monday)
Earth's residents were able to see the far side of the Moon for the first time, as photographs from the Lunik 3 satellite were released by the Soviet Union.
The Plymouth Valiant was unveiled by Chrysler, not in Detroit but at the International Motor Show in London.
Born: Evo Morales, President of Bolivia 2006 to 2019, and the first Bolivian president who was of an indigenous ethnic group, the Aymara people; in Orinoca

October 27, 1959 (Tuesday)
More than 1,000 people in Mexico were killed by a hurricane that struck the states of  Colima and Jalisco.  The town of Minatitlán was heaviest hit, with winds, floods and landslides.
Pakistan's President Muhammad Ayub Khan instituted the program he called "Basic Democracy", whereby the nation would be divided into 80,000 constituencies, each of which would elect its own representative.  These 80,000 persons would elect members of parliament and provincial legislatures, as well as the President, and would carry out governmental programs.
Born: Rick Carlisle, American NBA player, later coach of the NBA 2010-11 champion Dallas Mavericks; in Ogdensburg, New York

October 28, 1959 (Wednesday)
The synthetic fabric spandex (trademarked as Lycra) was introduced by DuPont, relying upon a "Fiber K", a synthetic elastomer that was lighter and more durable than conventional elastic, making it ideal for swimsuits.
U.S. Senator John F. Kennedy of Massachusetts began planning for a presidential run with a meeting at Bobby Kennedy's home in Hyannisport.

October 29, 1959 (Thursday)

Camilo Cienfuegos, the 26-year-old Commander of Cuba's revolutionary army, took off in a Cessna 310 from Camagüey, bound for Havana, along with three other people. The airplane vanished without a trace, although a bulletin on November 4 from Cuba announced that Cienfuegos had been found on "an island off southern Cuba". Cienfuegos was later celebrated as a Cuban martyr.
The character of Astérix the Gaul made his debut, appearing in the first regular issue of the comic magazine Pilote.
The Arkansas State Press, an African-American weekly newspaper founded in 1941 by Lucious Bates, published its last issue. During its 14 years, the newspaper had lobbied to end racial discrimination in Arkansas.
Died: Sisavang Vong, 74, King of Laos, since independence and King of Luang Prabang during the French colonial period since 1904, died in Luang Phrabang. He was succeeded by Crown Prince Savang Vatthana, who would be the last monarch.

October 30, 1959 (Friday)
In Stanleyville (now Kisangani), thirty African protesters were killed when colonial soldiers in the Belgian Congo dispersed a protest march made by Patrice Lumumba's Congolese National Movement, and Lumumba was arrested.
The Alabama Polytechnic Institute was formally renamed as Auburn University.
A meeting of Space Task Group, Wallops Station, and McDonnell personnel was held to review and evaluate Mercury escape-system qualification-test results. In the continuing efforts of this activity, the responsibility in attaining test objectives was apportioned among the three organizations.
Piedmont Airlines Flight 349, en route from Washington, D.C., crashed into a mountain near Crozet, Virginia, near the plane's destination of Charlottesville, killing 23 of the 24 people on board. The lone survivor, Phil Bradley, was located after 36 hours, and participated in the dedication of a memorial on the 50th anniversary of the disaster.
Died: War Admiral, 25, American thoroughbred horse who won the Triple Crown of U.S. horse racing in 1937

October 31, 1959 (Saturday)
The first American ICBM to carry a nuclear warhead was created when the 576th Flight Test Squadron armed an Atlas D missile at Vandenberg Air Force Base, after which the missile was placed on alert.
Television was seen in Africa for the first time, as the Western Nigeria Television Service started commercial broadcasting on WNTV in Ibadan.

Lee Harvey Oswald entered the U.S. Embassy in Moscow and told officer Richard Edward Snyder that he wished to renounce his American citizenship.  Snyder accepted Oswald's passport and a written note, but told Oswald that further paperwork would need to be completed.  Oswald did not complete the process and returned to the United States in 1962.  News of the defection made the front pages of American newspapers four years before he would resurface as the accused assassin of John F. Kennedy.
Born: Neal Stephenson, American sci-fi author known for The Diamond Age; in Fort Meade, Maryland

References

1959
1959-10
1959-10